Ramagundam Assembly constituency is a constituency of Telangana Legislative Assembly, India. It is one of constituencies in Peddapalli district. It includes the city of Ramagundam. It is part of Peddapalle Lok Sabha constituency.

Korukanti Chandar of All India Forward Bloc is representing the constituency from 12.12.2018.

Extent of constituency
The Ramagundam Assembly constituency includes the following:

Members of Legislative Assembly

Election results

Telangana Legislative Assembly election, 2018

Telangana Legislative Assembly election, 2014

Telangana Legislative Assembly election, 2009

See also
 List of constituencies of Telangana Legislative Assembly

References

Assembly constituencies of Telangana
Karimnagar district